Heterogamasus is a genus of mites in the family Ologamasidae. There are about five described species in Heterogamasus.

Species
These five species belong to the genus Heterogamasus:
 Heterogamasus calcarellus Lee, 1967
 Heterogamasus claviger Tragardh, 1907
 Heterogamasus euarmatus Karg, 1977
 Heterogamasus inermus Karg, 1977
 Heterogamasus spinosissimus (Balogh, 1963)

References

Ologamasidae
Articles created by Qbugbot